Macau competed at the 2008 Asian Beach Games held in Bali, Indonesia from October 18, 2008, to October 26, 2008. Macau finished with 1 bronze medal.

Nations at the 2008 Asian Beach Games
2008
Asian Beach Games